Piece or Pieces (not to be confused with peace) may refer to:

Arts, entertainment, and media

Games
 Piece (chess), pieces deployed on a chessboard for playing the game of chess
 Pieces (video game), a 1994 puzzle game for the Super NES
 Pieces, parts of a jigsaw puzzle or board game

Music

Albums 
 Piece (Lena Park album), 1998
 Piece (Monsta X album), 2018
 Pieces (Bobby Womack album), 1978
 Pieces (Erik Hassle album), 2010
 Pieces (IU album), 2021
 Pieces (Manassas album), 2009
 Pieces (Matt Simons album) or the title song, 2012
 Pieces (Michele Stodart album), 2016
 Pieces, Part One, by Epik High, 2008
 Pieces, by Daeg Faerch, 2020
 Pieces, by Kokia, 2011
 Pieces, an EP by Dismember, 1992

Songs 
 "Piece" (song), by Yui Aragaki, 2009
 "Pieces" (Chase & Status song), 2008
 "Pieces" (Gary Allan song), 2013
 "Pieces" (L'Arc-en-Ciel song), 1999
 "Pieces" (Sum 41 song), 2005
 "Hide"/"Pieces", by Red, 2007
 "Pieces", by All Saints from Red Flag
 "Pieces", by Anthrax from Volume 8: The Threat Is Real
 "Pieces", by Dark New Day from Twelve Year Silence
 "Pieces", by Fool's Garden from Dish of the Day
 "Pieces", by Matoma from One in a Million
 "Pieces", by Motor Ace from Shoot This
 "Pieces", by Rascal Flatts from Me and My Gang
 "Pieces", by Rob Thomas from The Great Unknown
 "Pieces", by Sevendust from Next
 "Pieces", by Stone Sour from Audio Secrecy
 "Pieces", by the Stylistics from Round 2
 "Pieces", by Tory Lanez from Memories Don't Die

Other uses in music
 Pieces, a band consisting of Buckethead and Bryan "Brain" Mantia
 Musical piece, a composition or a single performance or recording
 Piano piece, a musical piece written for piano

Other uses in arts, entertainment, and media
 Journalistic piece, the print or digital coverage of a news story
 "Piece" (short story) by Iain Banks, 1989
 Pieces (art installation), a diptych by the British artist and sculptor Baldrick Buckle
 Pieces (film), a cult horror film from 1983

Places
 Piece, Cornwall,  a village in Cornwall, England
 Piece, Silesian Voivodeship, a village in southern Poland
 Piece, Pomeranian Voivodeship, a village in Pomeranian Voivodeship, northern Poland
 Piece, Warmian-Masurian Voivodeship, a village in Warmian-Masurian Voivodeship, northern Poland

See also

 Piece by Piece (disambiguation)
 Piece of Cake (disambiguation)
 Pieces of Dreams (disambiguation)
 Game piece (disambiguation)
 Mouthpiece (disambiguation)
 Part (disambiguation)
 Portion (disambiguation)
 Section (disambiguation)
 Segment (disambiguation)
 Strip (disambiguation)
 Unit (disambiguation)
 
 
 Pea (disambiguation), including peas
 Peace (disambiguation)
 Pease (disambiguation)